Jesse MacLachlan (born March 26, 1990) is an American politician who served in the Connecticut House of Representatives from the 35th district from 2015 to 2021.

References

1990 births
Living people
Republican Party members of the Connecticut House of Representatives
21st-century American politicians